Keith Parker Bagley (10 February 1931 – 5 July 1999) was a New Zealand rugby union player. He was a member of the New Zealand national side, the All Blacks, on their 1953–54 tour of Britain, Ireland, France and North America, playing in 20 of the 36 games on tour, and scoring one try. However, he did not appear in any of the Test matches.

Bagley died in Gisborne on 5 July 1999, and was buried at Taruheru Cemetery.

References

1931 births
1999 deaths
Rugby union players from Gisborne, New Zealand
People educated at Gisborne Boys' High School
New Zealand rugby union players
New Zealand international rugby union players
Poverty Bay rugby union players
Waikato rugby union players
Manawatu rugby union players
East Coast rugby union players
Rugby union locks
Burials at Taruheru Cemetery